Baraftab-e Poshtkuh (also Romanized as Barāftāb-e Poshtkūh; also known as Barāftāb) is a village in Babuyi Rural District, Basht District, Basht County, Kohgiluyeh and Boyer-Ahmad Province, Iran. At the 2006 census, its population was 91, in 18 families.

References 

Populated places in Basht County